The Roman Catholic Diocese of Sibolga is a diocese located in the city of Sibolga in the Ecclesiastical province of Medan in Indonesia.

History
 November 17, 1959: Established as the Apostolic Prefecture of Sibolga from the Apostolic Vicariate of Medan
 October 24, 1980: Promoted as Diocese of Sibolga

Leadership
 Bishops of Sibolga (Roman rite)
 Bishop Fransiskus Tuaman Sinaga (March 6, 2021 – present)
 Bishop Ludovikus Simanullang, O.F.M. Cap. (March 14, 2007 – September 20. 2018)
 Bishop Anicetus Bongsu Antonius Sinaga, O.F.M. Cap. (later Archbishop) (October 24, 1980 – January 3, 2004)
 Prefects Apostolic of Sibolga (Roman Rite)
 Fr. Anicetus Bongsu Antonius Sinaga, O.F.M. Cap. (later Archbishop) (1978 – October 24, 1980)
 Bishop Peter G. Grimm, O.F.M. Cap. (November 17, 1959 – 1971)

References

External Links 
 GCatholic.org
 Catholic Hierarchy

Roman Catholic dioceses in Indonesia
Christian organizations established in 1959
Roman Catholic dioceses and prelatures established in the 20th century